Karen Ashotovich Grigorian (7 September 1947 – 30 October 1989) was an Armenian chess master, and son of the poet Ashot Grashi.

Born in Moscow, Russia, Grigorian won the Armenian Chess Championship three times (joint winner 1969, winner 1971, joint winner 1972), and the Moscow City Chess Championship twice (1975, 1979). He also participated in six USSR Chess Championships between 1971 and 1977, with his best performances being at the 1973 USSR Chess Championships, in which he finished at the 7th-8th place. He was awarded the International Master title in 1982.

Grigorian's trainers included Lev Aronin, and he was friends with the Latvian chess master Alvis Vītoliņš. Grigorian and Vitolins were excellent blitz players, but both also suffered from psychiatric disorders. At the age of 42, Grigorian committed suicide by jumping from the highest bridge in Yerevan.

His brother Levon Grigorian was also a chess player and won several chess championships.

References

External links 
 
 Grandmaster Games Database – Karen Grigorian
 Russian Silhouettes (3rd ed, 2009, Genna Sosonko), Chapter 10: The Jump – Alvis Vitolins

1947 births
1989 suicides
Sportspeople from Moscow
Armenian chess players
Russian chess players
Soviet chess players
Chess International Masters
Russian people of Armenian descent
Suicides by jumping in Armenia
Suicides in the Soviet Union
20th-century chess players